The Montenegro men's national under-16 and under-17 basketball team is a national basketball team of Montenegro, administered by the Basketball Federation of Montenegro. It represents the country in international men's under-16 and under-17 basketball competitions.

FIBA U16 European Championship participations

FIBA Under-17 Basketball World Cup participations

See also
Montenegro men's national basketball team
Montenegro men's national under-18 basketball team
Montenegro women's national under-16 basketball team

References

External links
 Official website 
 Archived records of Montenegro team participations

U
Men's national under-16 basketball teams
Men's national under-17 basketball teams